Dimitri Borovik (born 21 January 1974) is an Estonian biathlete. He competed at the 1998 Winter Olympics, the 2002 Winter Olympics and the 2006 Winter Olympics.

References

1974 births
Living people
Estonian male biathletes
Olympic biathletes of Estonia
Biathletes at the 1998 Winter Olympics
Biathletes at the 2002 Winter Olympics
Biathletes at the 2006 Winter Olympics
Sportspeople from Tallinn